The C.R. Breckinridge House is a historic house at 504 North 16th Street in Fort Smith, Arkansas.  It is a large two-story structure, with a hip roof, stuccoed walls, and a fieldstone foundation.  A porch extends across the front facade, supported by seven box columns, with an open veranda above.  The main entrance is flanked by sidelight windows and topped by a half-oval transom window.  The house was built in 1903 for Clifton R. Breckinridge, who represented the area in the United States Congress in the 1880s and 1890s, and was later United States Ambassador to Russia.

The house was listed on the National Register of Historic Places in 1979.

See also
National Register of Historic Places listings in Sebastian County, Arkansas

References

Houses on the National Register of Historic Places in Arkansas
Houses completed in 1903
Houses in Fort Smith, Arkansas
National Register of Historic Places in Sebastian County, Arkansas